Saula is a genus of beetles belonging to the family Endomychidae.

The species of this genus are found in Southeastern Asia and Japan.

Species:

Saula chujoi 
Saula japonica 
Saula nigripes 
Saula taiwana

References

Endomychidae
Coccinelloidea genera